Pasărea may refer to the following places in Romania:

 Pasărea, a village in Frumușani Commune, Călărași County
 Pasărea, a village in Brănești Commune, Ilfov County
 Pasărea, a tributary of the Cernat in Buzău County 
 Pasărea (Dâmbovița), a tributary of the Dâmbovița in Ilfov and Călărași Counties
 Pasărea (Danube), a tributary of the Danube in Teleorman County
 Pasărea (Parapanca), a tributary of the Parapanca in Giurgiu County